Metropolitan Corporation Rawalpindi (MCR) (Urdu: راولپنڈی میٹروپولیٹن کارپوریشن) is a municipal authority established under the Punjab Local Government Act 2022 in Rawalpindi Pakistan. MCR comprises 46 Union Councils in Rawalpindi city, Pakistan. The Union Councils elect their own chairman, who are in turn responsible for electing Rawalpindi's Mayor and Deputy Mayors.

The Metropolitan Corporation Rawalpindi is in-charge of many tasks in the city of Rawalpindi, such as waste management, environmental preservation, and construction projects, to name a few. Since its establishment, it has been determined that the Rawalpindi Corporation will take over the responsibilities for planning, the building control section, sanitation, road maintenance, the environment, water supply, play areas, the sports directorate, and all municipal services.

List of mayors of Rawalpindi 

Following is the list of mayors in recent time.

References

External links
https://www.politicpk.com/tag/rawalpindi-union-councils/
https://epaper.dawn.com/DetailImage.php?StoryImage=30_01_2018_153_005
https://www.dawn.com/news/391692
https://www.politicpk.com/rawalpindimurree-city-uc-list-mayors-chairmen-%D8%B1%D8%A7%D9%88%D9%84%D9%BE%D9%86%DA%88%DB%8C-%D8%B3%D9%B9%DB%8C/
https://www.pakworkers.com/tag/municipal-corporation-rawalpindi/
https://wespm.com/summary-of-the-punjab-local-government-act-2019/

Populated places in Rawalpindi District
Rawalpindi City
Municipal corporations in Pakistan
Metropolitan corporations in Pakistan